"Jenny", also titled "Jenny (I Wanna Ruin Our Friendship)", is a song written, produced and performed by the virtual band Studio Killers, released 3 May 2013 as the fourth single from their self-titled debut studio album. Played in the key of B major, the song, inspired by singer Chubby Cherry's crush on a person named Jenny, discusses a girl falling in love with her best friend and doing things such as stealing her lipstick and using her shirt as a pillow case. The single was a number-two hit on the Finnish Singles Chart, and was received positively by critics. A remix featuring German singer Kim Petras was released on 26 March 2021.

Production and composition
Studio Killers wrote, produced and performed "Jenny", with additional songwriting done by Rob Davis. Goldie Foxx and Dyna Mink made the instrumental beat, while Chubby Cherry wrote the melody and lyrics and performed the vocals. According to Chubby Cherry, this was one of the songs she wrote before forming Studio Killers. It was inspired by a crush Cherry had on a person named Jenny. She said the lyrics "sort of changed along the way because [Goldie Foxx and Dyna Mink] added some of their feelings with my feelings and it became kind of intriguing." About the song having to do with lesbian relationships, the most discussed topic in Finland at the time the song was released, the group thought "it should be nothing to shy away from." Lyrically the song describes a relationship with two women, in which one of them, Jenny, has a boyfriend. According to Popmatters writer Ryan Lathan, "it appears her dearest pal is stealing things out of her room and sleeping with her shirt as if it were a pillowcase. [The narrator] then is suggesting Jenny "forget those amigos" and shack up with her."

Described by a Scandipop writer as a more "straightforward," less eccentric pop song that previous Studio Killer singles, "Jenny" is a "half Europop, half commercial house" steel drum-filled track, with "a little bit of a Caribbean-meets-Mediterranean flair". The original track includes an accordion performed by Le Chien de Paris and steel drums played by Miguel Barradas. The song was mixed by James F. Reynolds, and later mastered by Dick Beetham at 360 Mastering in London. The track lasts for three minutes and 36 seconds, and is performed in B major at a tempo of 134 beats per minute. Writers noted the song's similar groove to Edward Maya's "Stereo Love".

Release and reception
"Jenny" is the seventh track from Studio Killers' self-titled debut album, and was issued as the fourth album's single, the third in Finland. The band released a two-minute preview of the song on their official SoundCloud page on 1 May. The single was released on 3 May to digital music stores in Finland by Warner Music, and later a CD promotional single came out on 11 May in Finland by Studio Killers Records. The song debuted at number 18 on the Finnish Singles Chart, reaching number two on the chart, as well as peaking number three on both Finland's download chart and Billboard'''s Finland Digital Songs chart. Upon its release, "Jenny" was called by critics "an obvious must-listen for your beach (and/or light stalking) playlists", "this summer's surprise hit waiting to happen," and "another hit out of the park for Studio Killers". It is lead vocalist Chubby Cherry's favorite track off of Studio Killers, with her saying that it "holds a personal place in my heart." In 2019, Billboard included the song in its list of the "30 Lesbian Love Songs".

In September 2020, TikTok user @isaac..thebully posted the first video of what became an internet challenge video trend titled "Darling You're My Best Friend," known by its hashtag #RuinOurFriendship; each video involves a subject talking with a friend or stranger (in-person or via text or Snapchat) with the following snippet from "Jenny" as the soundtrack. As of 30 November 2020, more than 359,000 videos used the song, and videos with the #RuinOurFriendship hashtag garnered more than 41.3 million views combined.

 Music video 
The music video for the song was released on 24 December 2015, as a Christmas gift to fans and was animated by Eliza Jäppinen. The music video features Chubby Cherry and Jenny driving to a dance club. Once they are there Chubby Cherry posts “(Jenny’s Boyfriend’s) head is small." Once this happens, Cherry tells Jenny that they should be lovers and soon they run away together. In this video, Cherry didn't sing during the video except for the bridge.

A lyric video was released 5 years later in 2020. It shows the lyrics in a Messages-like app with the lyrics written to Cherry's account.

Accolades

Personnel
Credits from liner notes of Studio Killers'': 
Studio Killers – songwriting, production, performer
Le Chien de Paris – accordion
Miguel Barradas – steel drums
Rob Davis – songwriting 
James F. Reynolds – mixing
Dick Beetham – mastering

Charts

Weekly charts

Year-end charts

Certifications

Release history

References

2013 songs
2013 singles
Synth-pop songs
Songs about fictional female characters
Animated music videos
Kim Petras songs
Atlantic Records singles
Lesbian-related songs